Triscaedecia septemdactyla is a moth of the family Alucitidae. It was described by Pagenstecher in 1900 as Hofmannia septemdactyla. It is found in Papua (Western New Guinea) and Papua New Guinea.

References

Moths described in 1900
Alucitidae